Gábor Jakubík (born 16 April 1990) is a Slovak sprint canoeist.

He participated at the 2018 ICF Canoe Sprint World Championships.

References

1990 births
Slovak male canoeists
Living people
ICF Canoe Sprint World Championships medalists in kayak
Sportspeople from Komárno
Canoeists at the 2015 European Games
European Games competitors for Slovakia